Park Leaze Halt railway station was one of two intermediate halts on the Cirencester branch line from , Gloucestershire, England. It was one of the shortest-lived stations in post-World War II Britain, being open for just over four years, between 1960 and 1964.

History

There was a single low platform, on the down side (north) of the line and on the Cirencester side of an overbridge; the platform was constructed from sleepers, and there was no shelter. With the opening of this halt, the railcar service between Kemble and Cirencester increased from 13 to 14 in each direction on weekdays (three more ran on Saturdays). The halt served an area of farmland, the immediate population being approximately 20. The nearest village was Ewen, but the distance from Ewen to Kemble was not much more than to Park Leaze Halt, so the halt was only useful for Ewen residents if they were visiting Cirencester.

The halt closed with the end of passenger services on the Cirencester Town branch on 6 April 1964, the last trains having run on the evening of 5 April.

Notes

References

External links
Site of Park Leaze Halt on navigable 1948 O.S. map

Disused railway stations in Gloucestershire
Railway stations opened by British Rail
Railway stations in Great Britain opened in 1960
Railway stations in Great Britain closed in 1964
Cirencester
Beeching closures in England